Abraham Sarkis (December 9, 1913 – June 1991) was a Boston mobster who, along with his partner Ilario "Larry Baione" Zannino were the most powerful and feared bookmakers in New England and New York. Their reign lasted over fifty years beginning in 1934. During their tenure, it was said they made millions for Raymond Patriarca, Sr., head of New England's Patriarca crime family and underboss of the Gambino crime family. During the 1960s, a failed attempt on his life was reportedly ordered by Zannino .

Further reading
United States. Congress. Senate. Committee on the Judiciary. Confirmation Hearings on Federal Appointments: Hearings Before the Committee on the Judiciary. 1989. 
United States. Congress. Senate. Committee on the Judiciary. Department of Justice Budget Authorization: Hearings Before the Committee on the Judiciary. 1978. 
United States. Congress. Senate. Committee on the Judiciary. Cigarette Bootlegging: Hearings Before the Subcommittee on Crime of the Committee on the Judiciary. 1978. 

1913 births
1991 deaths
People from New York (state)
Depression-era gangsters